Domingos António Lopes (born 23 August 1912, date of death unknown) was a Portuguese footballer who played as forward. He was born in Mina de São Domingos.

External links 
 
 
 

1912 births
Portuguese footballers
Association football forwards
Primeira Liga players
S.L. Benfica footballers
Portugal international footballers
Year of death missing